State Route 96 (SR 96) is a short state highway on the eastern coast of Maine. It connects to SR 27 in Boothbay on the mainland. It is one of several coastal routes which "dead-end" at or near the Atlantic coastline.

SR 96 has the shape of an inverted uppercase "L" and is signed east–west.  However, the majority of the highway's length in Linekin runs nearly due north and south.

Route description
SR 96 begins in the west at SR 27 just north of the town center of Boothbay Harbor.

The first mile of SR 96 runs directly on the town line between Boothbay and Boothbay Harbor, before completely passing into Boothbay.  SR 96 turns due south (signed east) onto the Linekin peninsula and passes through the village of East Boothbay, along Linekin Bay.  The SR 96 designation continues as far south as Middle Road, where the main highway splits into local roads servicing Ocean Point directly.  

SR 96 is named Ocean Point Road for its entire length, although the road does continue south into Ocean Point as an unnumbered local road.

Junction list

References

External links

Floodgap Roadgap's RoadsAroundME: Maine State Route 96

096
Transportation in Lincoln County, Maine